Mark Baldwin may refer to:

 Mark Baldwin (game designer) (born 1952), American computer game designer
 Mark Baldwin (choreographer), New Zealand choreographer
 Mark Baldwin (baseball) (1863–1929), American right-handed pitcher in Major League Baseball

See also